1 Merchant Square is a 42-storey, 140 m tall building under construction in Paddington, London. When complete, it will be the tallest building in the City of Westminster, with a hotel and 222 apartments.

Planned were revised in 2019.

References

Proposed skyscrapers in London
Buildings and structures under construction in the United Kingdom